This article is about the particular significance of the year 1969 to Wales and its people.

Incumbents
Secretary of State for Wales – George Thomas
Archbishop of Wales – Glyn Simon, Bishop of Llandaff
Archdruid of the National Eisteddfod of Wales
E. Gwyndaf Evans (outgoing)
Tilsli (incoming)

Events
1 April – Registration of births and deaths in the Welsh language is allowed for the first time.
May – Deep mining of slate at Oakeley Quarry, Blaenau Ffestiniog, ceases.
22 May – Engineer Morien Morgan becomes Director of the Royal Aircraft Establishment at Farnborough, Hampshire, having been knighted in the New Year Honours.
1 June – The South Wales Constabulary is created by merging the police forces of Glamorgan, Cardiff, Swansea and Merthyr Tydfil.
11 June – The Prince of Wales' (now Charles III) new standard is flown for the first time.
20 June – Llandudno Cable Car opened, the longest gondola lift system in the UK.
30 June – Two members of the Mudiad Amddiffyn Cymru (Movement for the Defence of Wales) are killed whilst placing a bomb outside government offices in Abergele in an attempt to disrupt the following day's events.
1 July
The Prince of Wales (now Charles III) is invested with his title at Caernarfon Castle.
Six members of the Free Wales Army are convicted in Swansea of public order and firearms offences; three are imprisoned.
3 July – Swansea is granted city status.
25 July – The Development of Tourism Act 1969 paves the way for creation of the Wales Tourist Board.
22 August – Closure of Dinorwic slate quarry.
November – Clashes between police and anti-apartheid protesters occur when the touring South African rugby team play Swansea. A silent protest takes place at an Ebbw Vale match.
December – Serious damage at Lluest-wen Reservoir requires emergency evacuation and repairs.

Arts and literature
Dafydd Iwan co-founds Sain Recordiau Cyf, which would become the major Welsh-language record label.

Awards

National Eisteddfod of Wales (held in Flint)
National Eisteddfod of Wales: Chair – James Nicholas
National Eisteddfod of Wales: Crown – Dafydd Rowlands
National Eisteddfod of Wales: Prose Medal – Emyr Jones

New books
Glyn Mills Ashton – Angau yn y Crochan
Pennar Davies – Meibion Darogan
Rhys Davies – Print of a Hare's Foot
T. Glynne Davies – Hedydd yn yr Haul
R. F. Delderfield – Come Home, Charlie, and Face Them
Raymond Garlick – A Sense of Europe
Glyn Jones – The Dragon Has Two Tongues
T. J. Morgan – Dydd y Farn Ac Ysgrifau Eraill
Dennis Selby – Sanctity: or There's No Such Thing as a Naked Sailor
John Griffith Williams – Pigau'r Sêr

Drama
Urien Wiliam – Cawl Cennin

Poetry
John Fitzgerald – Cadwyn Cenedl
D. Gwenallt Jones – Y Coed
Gwilym R. Jones – Cerddi
John Ormond – Requiem and Celebration
Penguin Book of Welsh Verse

Music

Albums
Amen Corner – Explosive Company (album)
Blonde on Blonde – Contrasts (album)
Man – 2 Ozs of Plastic with a Hole in the Middle

Singles
Huw Jones – Dŵr ("Water") (protest song)

Classical music
Jeffrey Lewis – Mutations I
Mansel Thomas – Mini-Variations on a Welsh Theme
David Wynne – Cymric Rhapsody no. 2

Film

English-language films
Richard Burton stars in Anne of the Thousand Days.
Hywel Bennett stars in The Virgin Soldiers.

Broadcasting
Cymdeithas yr Iaith Gymraeg (the Welsh Language Society) publishes a pamphlet entitled Broadcasting in Wales: To Enrich or Destroy Our National Life?

English-language television
Philip Madoc has roles in Manhunt!, The Avengers, Randall and Hopkirk (Deceased), The Champions and The Detective, among others.

Welsh-language television
Miri Mawr (children's)

Sport
BBC Wales Sports Personality of the Year – Tony Lewis
Cricket – Glamorgan win the County Championship.
Rugby union – Wales win the Five Nations Championship and take the Triple Crown.
football – Cardiff City win the Welsh Cup.

Births
6 January – Nicholas A'Hern, race walker
20 January – Nicky Wire, musician
5 February – Michael Sheen, actor
10 February – Francesca Rhydderch, novelist and academic
13 February – Gareth Abraham, footballer
21 February – James Dean Bradfield, musician
24 February – Gareth Llewellyn, rugby player
1 March – Dafydd Ieuan, musician
11 April – Cerys Matthews, singer
4 June – Julie Gardner, television producer
26 July – Tanni Grey-Thompson, born Carys Grey, wheelchair athlete
4 August – Tony Roberts, footballer
4 September – Sasha, DJ and record producer
8 September – Gary Speed, footballer and national manager (died 2011)
25 September – Catherine Zeta-Jones, actress
8 October – David Abruzzese, footballer
23 October – Chris Fry, footballer
6 December – Anthony Davies, snooker player
date unknown – Dyfed Wyn-Evans, operatic baritone

Deaths
20 January – Roy Evans, footballer, 25 (car crash)
3 February – Trevor Thomas, dual-code rugby player, 61
14 February – Ernest Roberts, judge, 78
10 March – Jimmy Wilde, boxer, 76
18 March – Llewellyn Alston, Royal Welch Fusiliers, 78
20 March – Arthur E. Powell, Theosophist writer, 86
26 March (in Australia) – Elizabeth Williams Berry, jockey of Welsh parentage, 114
27 March – David Lloyd, tenor, 56
31 March – Percy Jones, Wales international rugby player, 82
5 April – Mal Griffiths, footballer, 50
15 April 
John Davies, dual code rugby player, 28 (heart attack)
Cowboy Morgan Evans, Texan rodeo rider of Welsh descent, 66
20 April – Watkin Roberts, missionary, 82
4 May – Albert Stock, Wales international rugby player, 72
7 May – Stan Awbery, trade unionist and politician, 80
21 May – Ben Beynon, Welsh rugby union international and Swansea Town player, 75
23 May – Sir Evan Owen Williams, English-born Welsh engineer, 79
28 May – Rhys Williams, actor, 71
7 July – William David Davies, theologian, 72
26 July – Noel Hopkins, clergyman and organist, 77
12 August – Air Commodore James Bevan Bowen, RAF officer, 86
19 August – Percy Thomas, architect, 85
1 October – Dai Richards, footballer, 62
5 October – Sir Edward John Davies, judge in colonial service, 71 
15 October – Charlie Phillips, footballer, 59
18 October – Emrys Hughes, politician, 75
11 November – Robert Thomas Jenkins, historian, 88
21 November – D. B. Wyndham-Lewis, author, 78
7 December 
Bill Roberts, Wales international rugby union player, 60
(in London) Hugh Williams, dramatist, 65
20 December – Eleanor Evans, actress, singer and director, 76

See also
1969 in Northern Ireland

References

 
Wales
 Wales